Robb Mariani is a television personality, interior designer, and television host from Orlando, Florida. He is the middle of seven children. As a child, Mariani spent several decades touring the country with his family in a motorhome, where he developed a love of big rig trucks. He decided to follow his love to art for a career in interior design and studied graphic design for three years at the University of Wisconsin–Milwaukee. Mariani was a contestant in the second season of HGTV's reality program Design Star but was eliminated in the fifth episode.  He then hosted the show Car Crazy for one episode in 2009. He is currently the host of the SpeedTV show American Trucker.

References

Website
Official website

Living people
Participants in American reality television series
University of Wisconsin–Milwaukee alumni
Year of birth missing (living people)